Toni Simić (born June 8, 1976) is a Macedonian former professional basketball player who last played for Gostivar. He was also member of Macedonian national basketball team.

His son Teodor Simić is also a basketball player. He is a member of Barcelona Bàsquet B

External links
 Toni Simic profile at eurobasket.com
 Toni Simic profile at balkanleague.net
 Toni Simic profile at proballers.com

References

1976 births
Sportspeople from Skopje
Macedonian men's basketball players
Living people
Macedonian people of Serbian descent
Centers (basketball)
KK MZT Skopje players
KK Rabotnički players